Protorhamphosus is an extinct genus of prehistoric bony fish that lived during the Thanetian stage of the Paleocene epoch.

References

Gasterosteiformes
Paleocene fish
Cenozoic animals of Asia